This article lists described species of the family Asilidae start with letter W.

A
B
C
D
E
F
G
H
I
J
K
L
M
N
O
P
Q
R
S
T
U
V
W
Y
Z

List of Species

Genus Wilcoxia
 Wilcoxia cinerea (James, 1941)
 Wilcoxia martinorum (Wilcox, 1972)
 Wilcoxia monae (Wilcox, 1972)
 Wilcoxia painteri (Wilcox, 1972)
 Wilcoxia pollinosa (Wilcox, 1972)

Genus Wilcoxius
 Wilcoxius acutulus (Martin, 1975)
 Wilcoxius caputitis (Scarbrough & Perez-Gelabert, 2005)
 Wilcoxius crenus (Martin, 1975)
 Wilcoxius juventus (Scarbrough & Perez-Gelabert, 2005)
 Wilcoxius planus (Scarbrough & Perez-Gelabert, 2005)
 Wilcoxius similis (Scarbrough & Perez-Gelabert, 2005)
 Wilcoxius truncus (Martin, 1975)
 Wilcoxius tumidus (Scarbrough & Perez-Gelabert, 2005)

Genus Wygodasilus
 Wygodasilus pulchripes (Bromley, 1928)

Genus Wyliea
 Wyliea chrysauges (Osten-Sacken, 1887)

References 

 
Asilidae